Charlotte Hagenbruch (1896–1968) was a German actress and writer. She was the wife of the actor-director William Dieterle with whom she worked on several films. She emigrated with him to the United States in the early 1930s and later returned to Europe after the Second World War.

Selected filmography
 Tingeltangel (1922)
 The Tigress (1922)
 The Saint and Her Fool (1928)
 Triumph of Love (1929)
 Silence in the Forest (1929)
 Ludwig II, King of Bavaria (1929)
 Rustle of Spring (1929)
 The Sacred Flame (1931)
 The Mask Falls (1931)

References

Bibliography 
 Bock, Hans-Michael & Bergfelder, Tim. The Concise Cinegraph: Encyclopaedia of German Cinema. Berghahn Books, 2009.

External links 
 

1896 births
1968 deaths
German film actresses
German silent film actresses
20th-century German actresses
German stage actresses
People from Chemnitz
German emigrants to the United States
Film people from Saxony
20th-century German screenwriters